The New York Mutuals baseball team finished sixth in the  National Association in 1875. The league folded after this season and the Mutuals joined the new National League in 1876.

Regular season

Season standings

Record vs. opponents

Roster

Player stats

Batting
Note: G = Games played; AB = At bats; H = Hits; Avg. = Batting average; HR = Home runs; RBI = Runs batted in

Starting pitchers 
Note: G = Games pitched; IP = Innings pitched; W = Wins; L = Losses; ERA = Earned run average; SO = Strikeouts

Relief pitchers 
Note: G = Games pitched; W = Wins; L = Losses; SV = Saves; ERA = Earned run average; SO = Strikeouts

References

External links 
 1875 New York Mutuals at Baseball Reference

New York Mutuals seasons
New York Mutuals season
New York Mut
19th century in Brooklyn
Williamsburg, Brooklyn